Chakdina, also called Dinachak, is a village in Kharian Tehsil of Gujrat District, Punjab, Pakistan. It is situated at about five km westwards from the town of Lalamusa. It is located at 32°42'0N 73°53'0E with an altitude of 233 metres (767 feet).

Chakdina which previously fell in the Ganja Union Council now is part of Kotla Qasim Khan Union Council. Other villages in this Union Council are Saida Baraham, Sukhchaina, Chakori Khurd, Thurgala and Jalaldin.

Etymology
The name Chakdina is combination of words 'Chak' meaning village and 'Dina' meaning of Allahdin. The first inhabitant of the village Chaudhry Allahdin was nicknamed Dina hence Chakdina became the name of the village. There are other villages in the area which have names of the same pattern like Chak Ikhlas and Chak Rajjadi.

History
Many people still refer to the old name of the village which was Dinachak. It was founded in eighteenth century by Chaudhry Allahdin, a Muslim descendant of Hindu Shahi ruler Jayapala at the site of Shahpur, a city ruined by revolution of the time.

British India (BI) Steam Navigation Company (registered in 1856 as the Calcutta & Burmah Steam Navigation Company and got new name in 1862) borrowed the name Chakdina from this village to name two of its ships. Chakdina (1) built in 1914 was bombed and sunk in Mediterranean in 1941. Chakdina (2) built in 1951 was transferred to Peninsular and Oriental (P&O) Steam Navigation Company in 1973, in 1975 it was renamed Strathlairg and scrapped in Taiwan in 1977.

In 1966, after the Mangla Dam was built, some people from Mirpur (Azad Jammu and Kashmir) migrated to the village and inhabited a new locality namely Chak Fazal Shah within the revenue limits of Chakdina. They also purchased some agricultural land from the people of Chakdina. In exchange for some land, they helped its sellers to send their sons to England for job. As such five boys of the village were sent to England who later settled there. Some overseas workers belonging to this village have also settled in other European countries such as Norway, Italy, France, Spain and Portugal and in North America.

Population
Most of the present population of the village, traces its descent from Chaudhry Allahdin who belonged to the Kundowana sub-caste of the Gujars. However, the village also has other sub-castes of Gujars like Porr, Machiwal etc. The village also has Syed and Kashmiri families. According to 2017 population census, village's population is 1,628 which includes 782 males and 846 females.

Schools
The village has middle schools for girls and boys.

Tombs
There are tombs of saints Sain Khaki Shah, Hafiz Jaan Muhammad and Sain Bahawal Sher in the village.

Bazaar Dinaychakian
One of the famous bazaars in the town of Lalamusa is named after Chakdina and is called Bazaar Dinaychakian. Dinaychakian means, in Punjabi, the people from Dinachak. This bazaar was inhabited by Bagh Sha, a Hindu who migrated from Chakdina to Lalamusa in 1929. The first building in the bazaar was Haveli Bagh Sha. Some parts of this building are still present in original form.

Other places with similar names
There are a few other places with the similar names in the sub-continent. Another village named Chak Dina is located in Tehsil Gujrat of the same district. A village named Chak Dina is situated in Jammu area of Indian controlled Kashmir. This village falls near the Working Boundary -- the border between Sialkot district of Pakistan and the Indian controlled Kashmir. Yet another village with slightly different name called Chak Dina Khan is inhabited near Azamgarh in Uttar Pradesh, India.

References

Populated places in Gujrat District